Oakville Place Shopping Centre is an indoor shopping mall in Oakville, Ontario, Canada. Opened in 1981, the mall is the only major indoor mall in the Town of Oakville. It is managed by RioCan Real Estate Investment Trust.

It was installed in 1981 and designed by Soheil Mosun Limited of Toronto. The clock was removed in 2016 following a change in ownership. Oakville Place was described by the American Automobile Association as "Oakville's leading shopping mall".

The mall is located at the intersection of Queen Elizabeth Way and Trafalgar Road. Oakville Transit bus routes 13 (Westoak Trails) stops on the north side of the mall on Leighland Avenue and makes connections with Oakville GO Station.

Retailers
In 2019, several new retailers joined Oakville Place, such as L.L.Bean, PetSmart, GoodLife Fitness, Buy Buy Baby, La Vie En Rose, and STACK Restaurant; they were all added where Sears used to be. Laura was also added in 2023 next to pets smart where sears was once located.

One of the malls main anchors was simpsons which was located where sears used to be.

References

Buildings and structures in Oakville, Ontario
Shopping malls in Ontario
Shopping malls established in 1981
1981 establishments in Ontario
Tourist attractions in the Regional Municipality of Halton